Keak is an Ndu languages of Sepik River region of northern Papua New Guinea.

References

Languages of East Sepik Province
Ndu languages